Castle Heights Military Academy was a private military academy in Lebanon, Tennessee, United States. It opened in 1902, became a military school in 1918, and closed in 1986.

The Academy was founded in 1902 as Castle Heights School by David Mitchell, President of Cumberland University, also in Lebanon, and Isaac W. P. Buchanan, a mathematics professor there, together with A. W. Hooker and Laban Rice, an English professor who served as the school's headmaster and was later also President of Cumberland University. It was initially coeducational; it became a military preparatory school for boys in 1918 as a result of World War I.

In 1928, Castle Heights Military Academy was struggling financially and was bought for $100,000 by Bernarr Macfadden; the Bernarr Macfadden Foundation operated it until 1974. An auditorium and gymnasium were built and named for Macfadden, and Mitchell's house, purchased from his heirs in 1936 and used to house the junior school, was called Macfadden Hall. Macfadden required the students to eat salads every day, not to use condiments or pillows, to participate in sports, and to drink so much milk that the school acquired a dairy. Students' height and weight appeared on their monthly report cards. In 1954 the school had grown to almost 500 students, had a 150-acre campus including a hospital, and operated a summer camp. In 1963 Sanford Naval Academy was founded in Sanford, Florida, as a sister institution.

Despite a return to coeducation in 1970, the school ceased operations in 1986 in the face of declining enrollment and debt. Its buildings have been restored and now serve as the Lebanon City Hall, Lebanon Museum and History Center and other small businesses. Previously undeveloped areas of campus have been subdivided and now feature businesses such as banks and nursing homes. Records and other school memorabilia are maintained by Cumberland University. The Mitchell House served as the headquarters of the holding company for Cracker Barrel Old Country Store from 1998 to 2013.  It was purchased by Sigma Pi fraternity in 2013 and served as the fraternity's international headquarters until 2017.

Prominent alumni
Gregg Allman and Duane Allman, founders and members of The Allman Brothers Band
Rex Armistead, investigator of the Mississippi State Sovereignty Commission and controversial private detection involved in the Arkansas Project 
Wesley Clark, general in the United States Army
Dan Evins, co-founder of Cracker Barrel Old Country Store
Lance W. Lord, general in the United States Air Force
Pete Rademacher, heavyweight boxer
Herbert S. Walters, US senator
John Wyeth Chandler, Mayor of Memphis, 1972-1982
Rich Roberts, Entrepreneur, Franklin TN

References

 James A. Crutchfield, Hail, Castle Heights! An Illustrated History of Castle Heights School and Castle Heights Military Academy, Castle Heights Alumni Association (2003).

External links
 Alumni association
 National Register of Historic Places entry for Castle Heights

Private schools in Tennessee
Defunct United States military academies
Lebanon, Tennessee
Educational institutions disestablished in 1986
Educational institutions established in 1902
Defunct schools in Tennessee
Buildings and structures in Wilson County, Tennessee
1902 establishments in Tennessee